Asaphodes adonis (also known as the exquisite carpet moth) is a species of moth in the family Geometridae. It is endemic to the South Island of New Zealand. It is found in native forest at altitudes of between 300 and 1200 metres. Larvae have been reared on species of Ranunculus. Adults are on the wing in January  and February.

Taxonomy
This species was first described by George Vernon Hudson in 1898 under the name Xanthorhoe adonis using specimens collected at Castle Hill or at the Routeburn. Hudson went on to discuss and illustrate this species in his book The butterflies and moths of New Zealand. In 1939 Louis Beethoven Prout placed this species in the genus Larentia. This placement was not accepted by New Zealand taxonomists. In 1971 J. S. Dugdale placed this species in the genus Asaphodes. In  1988 Dugdale affirmed this placement in his catalogue of New Zealand Lepidoptera. The type specimens have not been located at Te Papa. Dugdale presumed that the syntype series of specimens Hudson sent to Meyrick is held in the Natural History Museum, London.

Description

Hudson originally described this species as follows:

A. adonis has vivid green forewings with dark coloured broad wavy lines edged with white which form a distinctive pattern. The dark coloured wavy lines can vary considerably in thickness. The hind wings are a pale orange shaded brown. This species can be distinguished from its close relative Asaphodes beata by the colour of its hind wings.

Distribution and habitat

This species is endemic to New Zealand and is found in the South Island only. It is regarded as uncommon and is found in native forest in the South Island at altitudes of between 300 and 1200 metres. A. adonis have been observed at Castle Hill and Lake Wakatipu, Lake Harris track, Bold Peak in Otago, Mt Aspiring Station,  and in the Te Anau Ecological District.

Behaviour
Adults of this species are on the wing in January and February. It can be found during the day resting on tree trunks, camouflaged against similar coloured lichen growth.

Host plant
Larvae of A. adonis have been reared on species of Ranunculus.

References

Moths described in 1898
Moths of New Zealand
Larentiinae
Endemic fauna of New Zealand
Taxa named by George Hudson
Endemic moths of New Zealand